Buongiorno papà (Italian for Good Morning Dad) is a 2013 Italian comedy film written and directed by Edoardo Leo, who also stars in the film. It  was nominated for two David di Donatello awards, for best supporting actor (Marco Giallini) and best original song, and for two Nastri d'argento awards, for best comedy film and for best actor (the latter nomination was a tie between Raoul Bova and Marco Giallini).

Plot 
Andrea's life is going great: He shares an apartment with his best friend, Paolo, in Rome; he enjoys his never-ending string of one-night stands; and his career is skyrocketing. Everything changes, however, when one day the extravagant 17-year-old Layla shows up on his doorstep and claims to be his daughter. Andrea's life is suddenly thrown into upheaval as he must learn to take responsibility for his new family.

Cast 
Raoul Bova as Andrea Manfredini
Marco Giallini as Enzo Brighi
Edoardo Leo as  Paolo
Nicole Grimaudo as Lorenza Metrano
Rosabell Laurenti Sellers as  Layla Brighi
Paola Tiziana Cruciani as Adele Stramaccioni
Mattia Sbragia as  Roberto Manfredini
Antonino Bruschetta as  Adriano

See also   
 List of Italian films of 2013

References

External links 

2013 films
2013 comedy films
Italian comedy films
Films directed by Edoardo Leo
2010s Italian films